Oscar Peterson + Harry Edison + Eddie "Cleanhead" Vinson is an album by the jazz pianist Oscar Peterson accompanied by trumpeters Harry "Sweets" Edison and the alto saxophonist Eddie "Cleanhead" Vinson that was recorded in 1986.

Reviews
The album was reviewed by Steve Hecox in Option magazine who was of the opinion that the album was "Yet another Norman Granz "let's put these guys together and see what happens" session." Hecox felt that the results were successful as they played to the performer's strengths with Peterson using his usual reliable three-piece rhythm section, and Eddie Vinson providing an instrumental session in which he stuck to alto sax.

Track listing
 "Stuffy" (Coleman Hawkins) – 9:13
 "This One's for Jaws" (Miles Davis, Harry "Sweets" Edison) – 4:53
 "Everything Happens to Me" (Tom Adair, Matt Dennis) – 4:36
 "Broadway" (Billy Bird, Teddy McRae, Henri Woode) – 5:13
 "Slooow Drag" (Edison, Joe Pass, Oscar Peterson, Eddie Vinson) – 10:36
 "What's New?" (Bob Haggart, Johnny Burke) – 4:28
 "Satin Doll" (Duke Ellington, Johnny Mercer, Billy Strayhorn) – 7:29

Personnel
 Harry "Sweets" Edison – trumpet
 Eddie "Cleanhead" Vinson – alto saxophone
 Oscar Peterson – piano
 Joe Pass – guitar
 Dave Young – double bass
 Martin Drew – drums

References

1986 albums
Oscar Peterson albums
Harry Edison albums
Eddie Vinson albums
Albums produced by Norman Granz
Pablo Records albums
Collaborative albums